Chopped can have the following meanings:

 Chopped and screwed, a technique of remixing hip hop music
 Chopped (TV series), a cooking reality television series which first aired in January 2009
 Short name for the salad restaurant chain Freshly Chopped

See also

Chop (disambiguation)